The Caucasus Cavalry Division (Kavkazskaya Kavaleriiskaya Diviziya) was a cavalry formation of the Russian Imperial Army.

Organization

1914
1st Brigade (Tiflis)
16th Dragoon Tver his Imperial Highness the Heir Tsarevich Regiment
17th Dragoon Regiment, his Majesty the Nizhny Novgorod
2 Brigade (Tiflis)
18th Dragoon Seversky King Christian IX the Danish Regiment
1-St Sunzhensko-Vladikavkaz General Sleptsova Terek Cossack Army Regiment
Caucasian mountain equestrian Division
1-I Horse Mountain battery
2-I Horse Mountain battery

1917
1st Brigade
16th Dragoon Regiment in Tver
17th Dragoon Regiment of Nizhny Novgorod
2nd Brigade
18th Dragoon Regiment Severskiy
1-St Hopjorskij Regiment of the Kuban Cossack voisko

Commanders
1883–1885: Zakharii Gul'batovich Chavchavadze
1885–1893: Ivane Amilakhvari
1893–1895: Tutolmin ivan fedorovitch
1903–1906: Louis Bonaparte (1864–1932)
1910–1915: Claes Charpentier
1915–1917: Sergei Belosselsky-Belozersky
1917: Anatoli Nazarov
1917: Aleksander Karnicki

References

Cavalry divisions of the Russian Empire